Add a Line was a daytime radio game show which aired on ABC July 4, 1949, to September 26, 1949.  The title came from the show's format, which "called for players to add the final line to a rhyme given to them by the host."

The 30-minute program was broadcast at 2:30 p.m. and other time periods during its run. The host was John Nelson (1915-76), who was heard on other audience participation radio shows, including Bride and Groom and Breakfast at Sardi's. In Radio and Television (Appleton-Century-Crofts, 1950), Garnet R. Garrison and Giraud Chester noted:
By 1949, the give-away programs had taken on the character of a bonanza. One CBS program offered a jackpot of $50,000 to the lucky winner. NBC launched a mammoth quiz called Hollywood Calling to compete with the Jack Benny show. ABC had Stop the Music, Strike It Rich and Add a Line. Mutual, with its Queen for a Day, managed to give away more prizes than any of the other networks.

References

1940s American radio programs
1950s American radio programs
American radio game shows
1940s American game shows
ABC radio programs